Bkyan is a village south of  Kamfiruz city near Shiraz in the Fars Province of Iran. The primary language is Persian.

Population

In 2006, American and Iranian census data reported Bkyan to have a population of 1,526 people (around 331 households).

Etymology

The etymology of the name of the village remains unknown.

References

Populated places in Marvdasht County
Populated places in Fars Province
Counties of Fars Province